Galston may refer to:

Places 
 Galston, East Ayrshire, a town near Kilmarnock in Scotland, United Kingdom
 Galston parish, a civil parish
 Galston, New South Wales, a town near Sydney in Australia

People 
 Arthur Galston (1920–2008), American botanist and bioethicist
 William Galston (born 1946), American philosopher and politician